Peddapalli Junction (station code: PDPL) is a railway station that serves Peddapalli town of Peddapalli district in state of Telangana, India. It is under the administration of Secunderabad railway division of South Central Railway. The station is located on New Delhi–Chennai main line that connects North and South India, and also serves as the junction point for the Peddapalli-Nizambad line .

History
The railway line between Kazipet and Balharshah was completed in 1929, which made Chennai to directly link to Delhi.
Peddapalli–Nizamabad railway line (177 km) was sanctioned by P.V. Narasimha Rao, 10th Prime Minister of India in the year of 1994. Peddapalli-Karimnagar railway line was completed and train services began in 2001 and later on Karimnagar–Jagityal line was completed and demu services were started in 2007. The entire line to Nizamabad was completed in the year 2017.

Layout and services

The station is situated on Delhi–Chennai line which is broad-gauge double electrified. And the single line that passes towards Nizamabad runs on diesel locos, where it meets Secunderabad–Manmad line. The station is served by 22 trains every day and 14 non-daily trains. Most of the trains halting or passing through this station are bound for New Delhi. 
, there are no trains that directly connect Peddapalli to Nizamabad or vice versa but there are numerous train services running to and fro Nizamabad till  and from Karimnagar till Peddapalli.

See also
Ramagundam railway station
Hazur Sahib Nanded railway station
List of railway stations in India

References

External links

Railway stations in Karimnagar district
Secunderabad railway division
Railway junction stations in Telangana